In the Zone is the fourth studio album by American singer Britney Spears. It was released on November 1, 2003, by Jive Records.

With the conclusion of her Dream Within a Dream Tour in July 2002 and the end of her relationship with singer Justin Timberlake, Spears planned to take a six-month break from her career; however, work for In the Zone began later that November. She began writing songs for the album while touring internationally, despite not knowing the direction of the record. She experimented with different producers, trying to find those with whom she had chemistry. The first song recorded was "Touch of My Hand", which Spears claimed set the mood for the album. She co-wrote all but four songs, and often changed the lyrics to suit herself. Spears stated she was an autobiographical songwriter, although not to the point where she felt self-exploited.

The eclectic music of In the Zone incorporates pop and urban music styles with instrumentation from techno beats, guitars, drums, synthesizers, strings, and Middle Eastern musical instruments. Its lyrical themes range from romance and partying to more explicit ones such as sex and masturbation. Spears explained that the album's sexual nature was subconscious and happened while she was in the process of developing the album. She collaborated with artists such as Madonna and the Ying Yang Twins on the album, while the contributions to its production came from a wide range of producers, including Bloodshy & Avant, R. Kelly, Trixster, Moby, Guy Sigsworth and the Matrix.

In the Zone received critical acclaim upon its release, with music critics widely praising its innovative production, aesthetics, blend of eclectic genres, and lyricism, though some criticized Spears' vocals in certain tracks for being distant and processed. A global commercial success, it debuted atop the US Billboard 200 with first-week sales of 609,000 copies, making Spears the first female artist to have four consecutive number-one albums. Retrospectively, the album is widely considered a major turning point in Spears' artistic journey and a culmination in her transition from a teen pop star to a more adult artist. Various critics have considered it the album that pushed Spears past her contemporaries and establishing her as the definitive female artist of the 2000s.

In the Zone produced four singles. "Me Against the Music", featuring Madonna, reached the top ten in nearly every country except the United States, where it only peaked at number 35 on the Billboard Hot 100. "Toxic" peaked atop the charts in eight countries and at number nine on the Billboard Hot 100, becoming Spears' first US top-ten hit since "Oops!... I Did It Again" (2000), and won Spears her first Grammy Award. "Everytime" peaked at number 15 on the US Billboard Hot 100 and within the top ten nearly everywhere else. "Outrageous" was plagued by a lack of promotion due to Spears injuring her knee while filming its accompanying music video, and only peaked at number 79 on the US Billboard Hot 100. To promote the album, Spears made numerous televised appearances and performances, and embarked on the Onyx Hotel Tour (2004).

Background and development 
In October 2001, Spears released her third studio album Britney, which portrayed more mature themes. Despite selling over four million copies in the United States, it was viewed as "poor-selling" in comparison to her previous efforts. The following year, her three-year relationship with pop singer Justin Timberlake ended after months of speculation. After the Dream Within a Dream Tour in support of Britney ended in July 2002, Spears announced a six-month break. In November, she revealed that she had started working on her next studio album. She explained: "Well, actually, I just said that I wanted two or three weeks off. [....] And the whole world was like, 'Ohmigod, [sic] she's gone..."

While in Europe, Spears met with William Orbit and Daft Punk about possible collaborations, and originally confirmed previous collaborators Darkchild and the Neptunes as producers. When asked by The Hollywood Reporter about the direction of the record, Spears responded it was an organic evolution, adding: "It should just happen naturally from the way you feel. [...] Whatever happens, happens". Additionally, Spears scheduled meet-and-greets with Timbaland and Missy Elliott in an effort to help evolve her sound. Elliott was enlisted in further production work with Nisan Stewart for Spears' project; however, none of the initial material was released. Spears also worked with James Murphy of LCD Soundsystem, but their work was unproductive; Murphy said: "We were both lying on the floor, head-to head, working on lyrics in a notepad. She seemed eager to please, but it went nowhere. She went to dinner and just never came back." Limp Bizkit frontman Fred Durst wrote and produced three trip hop tracks recorded by Spears in January 2003. However, after news of an affair between them broke, Durst told Jive Records he would not let them use the songs. In March 2003, Lauren Christy from the Matrix spoke about the development of the album with MTV News, and likened their work with Spears to Madonna's album Ray of Light (1998). Scott Spock, also from the Matrix, continued comparing her to Madonna by saying:
She's taking it to the next level in her career. Madonna constantly takes what's in the club and puts what she does on top of it and makes it mainstream. I think Britney is starting to embrace that concept where she's looking to work on different stuff, instead of using the same familiar, and applying it to her. [...] I don't think [her fans] will be freaked out or upset. I think they'll be really into what's going to happen.
Spears previewed several songs to Quddus Philippe of MTV in May 2003, including "Touch of My Hand", "Brave New Girl" and "Everytime". Spears commented: "I've really been able to take my time and have creative control and make [the new album] special, special, special." On August 27, Spears opened the 2003 MTV Video Music Awards by performing a medley of "Like a Virgin" and "Hollywood" with Madonna, Christina Aguilera and Missy Elliott. The performance started with Spears appearing on stage on top of a giant wedding cake while wearing a wedding gown and veil; she sang the first few lines of "Like a Virgin" before Aguilera appeared from behind the cake and joined her. Madonna then emerged from the cake wearing a black coat and a hat and started singing "Hollywood" before proceeding to kiss Spears and Aguilera on the lips. Elliott came out from a wedding chapel to sing her song "Work It" halfway through the performance. The kiss generated strong reaction from the media. The performance was listed by Blender magazine as one of the 25 sexiest music moments in television history. In 2008, MTV listed the performance as the number-one opening moment in the history of the MTV Video Music Awards.

Recording and production 

For In the Zone, Spears worked with hit producers such as Bloodshy & Avant, R. Kelly, Diddy, Christopher Stewart, Moby, Guy Sigsworth and the Matrix. She first started writing songs for the album during her Dream Within a Dream Tour. Spears commented about writing while touring: "The only thing that was scary to me is that I didn't know if they were good. [But] You can't trust anybody. You have to go with your feelings." Spears commented that she was an autobiographical songwriter, although not to the point she felt self-exploited. Following the end of the tour, Spears invited her friend and backing vocalist Annet Artani to her home in Los Angeles. They started writing songs at the piano, and shortly after, they traveled to Lake Como in Lombardy, Italy. Among the tracks they worked on was "Everytime", which Artani confirmed to be written as a response to Justin Timberlake's "Cry Me a River", as well as "Shine", written by Spears about her sister Jamie Lynn, which was left unfinished. Earnest recording of the album began in November 2002. Spears commented that although she did not know initially what direction she wanted to go with the album, she took time to work with different producers and to find those who she had chemistry with. The first song recorded for In the Zone was "Touch of My Hand", and Spears said it "really did provide a balance for the rest of the record. We just went from there." Following the recording sessions for "Everytime" at the Conway Recording Studios in Los Angeles, Spears complimented Sigsworth, saying: "I just basically told him exactly how I wanted the song to sound. And he was so amazing because there's a lot of producers you tell them things and they don't get it. And you're like oh, that's not the right way. He got it just right. He was amazing."

Christopher Stewart and Penelope Magnet, known collectively as RedZone, presented Spears with the third song they had written and produced, titled "Pop Culture Whore". While her management liked the track, she rejected it, telling them the song "sucked". After bonding with Spears during a night in New York City to "get in her world", as Magnet explained, it was easier to "actually write and know what she would and wouldn't say, to know where her real vibe is". Stewart and Magnet began working on the first version of "Me Against the Music"; Stewart came up with the track, while Magnet developed the melody on a piano and some of the lyrics. During the recording sessions, Stewart recalls that the studio's air-conditioning died for three days, but Spears "didn't complain or anything, and for me that shows she's where she is for a reason." While rehearsing for their performance at the 2003 MTV Video Music Awards, Spears played a finished version of "Me Against the Music" to Madonna. After Madonna commented that she liked the track, Spears asked her to do the song with her. RedZone then handed "Me Against the Music" to Madonna, who arranged and recorded her vocal additions on her own, therefore making the song a duet. Spears, who had been a fan of Madonna for years, was "beyond surprised" when she heard Madonna's verse. She said "I just asked her to do a little thing, but she really went there. She did a lot of stuff to it." RedZone were then enlisted to work on several more songs for the album, including co-writing "Early Mornin'", recording background vocals for "Outrageous" and producing "The Hook Up".

The Matrix commented that after they presented songs to Spears, she tailored them to suit herself, especially the lyrics. Member Lauren Christy said: "... she really knows what she wants. She knows if she's trying something on that doesn't fit right for her. She's like, 'No, that's not me.' She's not one to strap on some sort of fake image." Christy also claimed to be impressed with Spears's vocal ability during the recording of "Shadow". Steve Anderson, Lisa Greene and Stephen Lee wrote "Breathe on Me" at Metrophonic Studios in London. Before meeting with the other writers, Anderson thought of two concepts for songs specifically for Spears: one he had worked on "for ages", and "Breathe on Me", which he drafted on the morning of the sessions. Greene and Lee did not like the first concept, and they wrote "Breathe on Me" with Anderson. The song was produced by Mark Taylor, who kept most of the programming done by Anderson. With Taylor, Spears recorded "Breathe on Me" and "And Then We Kiss", latter of which did not make the album. Other recording locations for the album included the Battery Studios, Daddy's House Recordings and The Dojo in New York City; 3:20 Studios, Decoy Studios, Pacifique Recording Studios, Record Plant and Westlake Recording Studios in Los Angeles; The Chocolate Factory, in Chicago, Triangle Sound Studios in Atlanta, Olympic Studios in London, and Murlyn Studios in Stockholm. Throughout 2003, Spears started testing tracks by playing them in nightclubs such as Show in New York City. Before the album was released, Spears' manager Larry Rudolph commented that it was important for Spears to continue moving away from a traditional pop sound, citing "I'm a Slave 4 U" and "Boys" from Britney as departures from her previous music. Barry Weiss, then-president of Jive Label Group, added: "She has achieved what she set out to achieve, which was to make a mature album that didn't sound like something she would have done three years while still making a commercial album that has hit singles. [...] It's the kind of record she should be doing right now, and it came down to her to make it."

Music and lyrics 

According to Billboard, In the Zone marked a musical departure for Spears. Instead of traditional pop, the album is darker and more dance-oriented. Spears talked about the overall sound of the album with Rolling Stone, saying: "I'd describe it as trance-y, kind of vibe record—something you could listen to that's no so song-structured [...] Of course I'm not doing '...Baby One More Time' and those massive hits anymore. I think this record is where I am at right now in my life. It's sensual, it's sexual. I'm probably writing about that subconsciously because I don't have that right now." Sal Cinquemani of Slant Magazine described the record's sound as "bold mix of hip-hop and dance music", while Amy Schriefer of NPR stated the album "mix[es] dance, house, crunk, Diwali beats and Neptunes-style hip hop". Tom Bishop of BBC News stated that the record combines bhaṅgṛā, R&B and hip hop. Caroline Sullivan of The Guardian deemed In the Zone "a happy collision of house, dreamy electro-pop and Britney’s lyrical preoccupations [...] which have her perched on the cusp between teen poppet and sexually confident woman." According to William Shaw of Blender, the main theme of In the Zone is "Spears’s awakening to her sexuality as a single woman."

In the Zone opens with "Me Against the Music", constructed as a duet with Madonna after she was added to the track. Spears and Madonna trade lines during the verses, and Madonna sings solo in the bridge. The instrumentation in the song includes influences of hip hop and funk guitars. The song's lyrics feature Spears and Madonna singing of the pleasures of letting go on the dancefloor, in "I'm up against the speaker / Trying to take on the music / It's like a competition". The second song, "I Got That (Boom Boom)", is an Atlanta-style hip hop track featuring the Ying Yang Twins. "Showdown" has "bubbly" beats and its lyrics, about "fighting and making up with carnal relations", include the lines "I don't really want to be a tease / But would you undo my zipper, please?" Rolling Stone classified the song pop-dancehall. "Breathe on Me" was described as the most sensual song of the record and compared to Madonna's 1992 studio album Erotica. On the Euro trance and ambient-techno song with trip hop influences, Spears sings: "Oh, it's so hot, and I need some air / And boy, don't stop 'cause I'm halfway there" and "Just put your lips together and blow." "Early Mornin'" depicts Spears looking for men at a club in New York City. The song has a percolating beat and featured subdued vocals from Spears, who purrs and yawns through the track. The nightclub Show is referenced. "Toxic", which Spears later named her favorite song from her career, was originally offered to Australian singer Kylie Minogue. It contains elements of hip hop, electropop, and bhangra music, and features varied instrumentation, such as drums, synthesizers, high-pitched strings and surf guitars. Lyrically, "Toxic" talks about being addicted to a lover.

"Outrageous" is a hip hop-inspired track which, according to MTV, features Spears "whisper[ing] and moan[ing] [...] with a snake charmer melody giving the song an exotic feel." The lyrics address materialism and amusement, with the singer referencing in the chorus a number of things that give her pleasure. On "Touch of My Hand", which Spears felt it was comparable to Janet Jackson's "That's the Way Love Goes" (1993), she sings in a lower register. The instrumentation contains elements of music from the Far East, particularly in its use of the Chinese instrument the erhu, and its lyrics refer to masturbation: "Into the unknown, I will be bold / I'm going to the places I can be out of control / And I don't want to explain tonight / All the things I've tried to hide." "The Hook Up" has a reggae feel and features Spears singing in a Jamaican Patois accent. The power ballad "Shadow" talks about how reminders of a lover can still linger after he's gone. The lyrics of "Brave New Girl" talk about a young woman finding her passion and losing inhibitions. Backed by choppy, electro-funk beats, she sings in a bouncy near-rap: "She's gonna pack her bags, she's going to find her way, she's going to get right out of this / She don't want New York, she don't want L.A., she's going to find that special kiss." The Eurodance and pop song was inspired by No Doubt, Blondie and Madonna. "Everytime" begins with a piano introduction accompanying Spears's breathy vocals, which build from soft to strong throughout the song. Its lyrics are a plea for forgiveness for inadvertently hurting a former lover. In the song, Spears explains she feels unable to continue in lines such as "Everytime I try to fly I fall / Without my wings I feel so small". During an interview with MTV, Spears said: "It's about heartbreak, it's about your first love, your first true love. That's something all people can relate to, because you all have that first love that you think you're going to be with the rest of your life." When asked if "Everytime" was about Justin Timberlake, she responded: "I'll let the song speak for itself." The Rishi Rich's Desi Kulcha Remix of "Me Against the Music" removes the original melody of the song and adds a clattering backbeat and Punjabi shouts. On the international editions bonus track "The Answer", Spears sings that her lover is the answer to all her needs: "Who can hold me tight, keep me warm through the night? / Who can wipe my tears when it's wrong, make it right? / Who can give me love till I'm satisfied? / Who's the one I need in my life?". On the Australian, Japanese and UK editions bonus track "Don't Hang Up", she pleads on the phone for her lover to keep her satisfied long-distance.

Release and promotion 

To promote In the Zone, Spears first performed the lead single "Me Against the Music" at the 2003 NFL Kickoff Live on September 4, 2003. The performance segued into a medley of "...Baby One More Time" and "I'm a Slave 4 U", which included pyrotechnics. On September 14, Spears played a surprise concert at Rain Nightclub in the Palms Casino Resort, and performed "Me Against the Music", "Breathe on Me" and a medley of "...Baby One More Time" and "I'm a Slave 4 U". On October 18, she performed "Me Against the Music" and "Everytime" on Saturday Night Live. Spears opened the 2003 American Music Awards on November 16 with a performance of "Me Against the Music". The following day, a concert special titled Britney Spears: In the Zone aired on American Broadcasting Company (ABC). On November 18–the day In the Zone was released in the United States–she performed "Me Against the Music" and "(I Got That) Boom Boom" on Total Request Live at Times Square. The ABC special and Total Request Live performances would later be included on video album Britney Spears: In the Zone, released on April 6, 2004. The video debuted atop the US Music Video Sales and was certified double platinum by the Recording Industry Association of America (RIAA). "Me Against the Music" was also performed on The Tonight Show with Jay Leno on November 17, 2003, and on Live with Regis and Kelly on November 24. She also performed "Toxic", "Breathe on Me" and "Me Against the Music" as the headliner of the Jingle Ball on December 8, at the Staples Center.

In November 2003, Zomba Label Group president Barry Weiss had spoken to Billboard and said that In the Zone was being promoted on a global level, exhausting areas such as print and electronic media, television, radio and video to raise awareness of its release. In addition, Jive worked with lifestyle marketer the Karpel Group to market the album to the gay community. Other broader-based marketing efforts included a tie-in with marketing company LidRock, where after ordering a soda at Sbarro, customers received a cup featuring the artwork and a three-inch disc in the lid featuring "Brave New Girl" and songs by two other artists; in December, an updated LidRock disc was made available, including a remix of "Me Against the Music" without Madonna, as well as songs by fellow Jive acts Nick Cannon and Bowling for Soup. Regal Theaters also showed a short film that included footage of the making of Spears's music videos. Two national television advertising campaigns had begun on November 1–one with a teaser ad on Saturday Night Live and another exclusively on MTV. No sponsored cross-marketing campaigns were planned, as Larry Rudolph explained: "[This time] it's going to be more about the music than about corporate tie-ins." In terms of international exposure, during a four-month period Spears was featured in seven mini TV-specials and over 150 interviews outside the US. Among the international performances were Spears opening the NRJ Music Awards in France with "Toxic" on January 24, 2004, and a performance of "Everytime" on the June 25 episode of Top of the Pops in the United Kingdom, which became the final televised performance in support of the album.

A tour to further promote In the Zone was announced in December 2003, originally titled In the Zone Tour. However, Spears was sued for trademark infringement by the San Diego company Lite Breeze, Inc. and was banned from using the phrase "in the zone", hence the tour's title was changed to The Onyx Hotel Tour. It commenced on March 2, 2004 at the San Diego Sports Arena. Spears felt inspired to create a show with a hotel theme which she later mixed with the concept of an onyx stone. The stage, inspired by Broadway musicals, was less elaborate than her previous tours. The setlist was composed mostly by songs from In the Zone as well as some of her past songs reworked with different elements of jazz, blues and Latin percussion. Tour promoter Clear Channel Entertainment marketed the tour to a more adult audience than her previous shows, while sponsor MTV highly promoted the tour on television shows and the network's website. The tour was divided into seven segments: Check-In, Mystic Lounge, Mystic Garden, The Onyx Zone, Security Cameras, Club and the encore. Check-In displayed performances with dance and advanced in the hotel theme. Mystic Lounge featured an homage to Cabaret and other musicals, while remixing some of Spears's early hits. Mystic Garden displayed a jungle-inspired stage. The Onyx Zone displayed a ballad performance with acrobats. Security Cameras was the raciest part of the show, with Spears and her dancers emulating different sexual practices. Club displayed a performance with urban influences. The encore consisted of a system malfunction interlude and Spears performed wearing a red ensemble. The tour received mixed reviews from contemporary critics, who praised it for being an entertaining show while criticizing it for looking "more [like] a spectacle than an actual concert". The Onyx Hotel Tour was commercially successful, grossing $34 million. In March, Spears suffered a knee injury onstage which forced her to reschedule two shows. On June 8, Spears fell and hurt her knee again while filming the accompanying music video for "Outrageous". She underwent surgery and the remainder of the tour was cancelled.

Singles 
"Me Against the Music" was released as the lead single from In the Zone on October 14, 2003. Jive Records' choice for the first single was originally "Outrageous", but Spears convinced them to release "Me Against the Music". The song received mixed reviews from music critics; some felt it was a strong dance track, while others referred to it as lackluster and disappointing. "Me Against the Music" achieved international commercial success, peaking atop of the charts in countries such as Australia, Denmark, Hungary, Ireland and Spain, as well as the European Hot 100 Singles. It also peaked at number two in Canada, Italy, Norway and the United Kingdom, and inside the top five in many other countries; however, it peaked at number 35 on the US Billboard Hot 100, being Spears' lowest-charting lead single. The song won the Hot Dance Single of the Year award at the 2004 Billboard Music Awards. In the song's accompanying music video, directed by Paul Hunter, Spears chases Madonna inside a nightclub.

"Toxic" was released as the second single from In the Zone on January 12, 2004, to widespread critical acclaim. After trying to choose between Jive's suggestions "(I Got That) Boom Boom" and "Outrageous", Spears selected "Toxic" instead. It attained worldwide commercial success, reaching the top five in 15 countries, while topping the charts in Australia, Canada, Hungary, Norway and the United Kingdom. In the United States, it peaked at number nine on the Billboard Hot 100, becoming her first single to peak inside the top ten since "Oops!... I Did It Again" (2000). Directed by Joseph Kahn, the accompanying music video for the song portrays Spears as a secret agent in the search of a vial of green liquid. After she steals it, she enters an apartment and poisons her unfaithful boyfriend. The video also includes interspersed scenes of Spears naked with diamonds over her body. "Toxic" won Spears her first Grammy Award, for Best Dance Recording (2005), and is often referred to as one of her signature songs.

"Everytime" was released as the third single from In the Zone on May 10, 2004, to critical acclaim. A commercial success, it peaked within the top five in most countries, while reaching the top of the charts in Australia, Hungary, Ireland and the United Kingdom, and number 15 on the US Billboard Hot 100. Its accompanying music video, directed by David LaChapelle, portrays Spears as a star hounded by paparazzi, who drowns in her bathtub when she starts bleeding from a wound in her head. In the hospital, doctors fail to resuscitate her while a child is born in the next room, implying she reincarnated. The original treatment would have had Spears killing herself from a drug overdose, but the plot was removed after it received criticism by several organizations, who perceived it as a glamorization of suicide.

"Outrageous" was released as the fourth and final single from In the Zone on July 13, 2004. The song was finally chosen as a single after it was selected as the theme song for the film Catwoman (2004). It received mixed reviews from critics, as some praised its funky sound, noting its influence from Michael and Janet Jackson, while others deemed it "forgettable". Plagued by low promotion, the song became the album's lowest-charting single, peaking at number 79 on the US Billboard Hot 100. Directed by Dave Meyers, its accompanying music video was being filmed in New York City on June 8, when Spears injured her knee and had to undergo arthroscopic surgery. The video was cancelled, as well as the remainder of the Onyx Hotel Tour and the feature in the Catwoman soundtrack.

Critical reception 

Upon its release, In the Zone received generally favorable reviews from music critics. At Metacritic, which assigns a normalized rating out of 100 to reviews from mainstream critics, the album received an average score of 66, based on 13 reviews. Jason Shawhan of About.com gave a positive review, saying that while the album's vibe is sexy, the result is a personal statement from Spears. He also added: "T[here]'s another thing about Spears' new record, as none of her previous albums ever managed to produce any kind of sustained emotional response than the pleasure that comes from a good pop record. I miss Max Martin, for sure, but it feels like Ms. S. has been paying attention to La Ciccone. To put it another way, this is Britney's True Blue." Stephen Thomas Erlewine of AllMusic said that the album "[is] all club-ready, but despite some hints of neo-electro and the Neptunes, it doesn't quite sound modern—it sounds like cuts from 1993 or Madonna's Bedtime Stories and Ray of Light. Production-wise, these tracks are not only accomplished but much more varied than any of her previous albums." Ruth Mitchell of the BBC called "Early Mornin'" the best track from the album, but added: "Sadly, her attempts to prove her new-found maturity are what overwhelm and cloud all that is good about In The Zone." Mim Udovitch of Blender commented: "This I'm-coming-out record is an unhesitant move from songs of the heart to songs of the groin [...] No longer a girl, freed from slavery, now fully a woman, she makes a pretty convincing mistress."

David Browne of Entertainment Weekly called "Brave New Girl" and "Touch of My Hand" the best and most straightforward moments of In the Zone, but added that "On a CD intended to celebrate her lurch into adulthood, Spears remains distant and submerged. For all her freedom, she's still finding her way." Jon Pareles of Rolling Stone said: "[Spears'] voice is so processed, its physicality almost disappears. [...] In the Zone offers strip-club, 1-900 sex, accommodating and hollow. Beyond the glittering beats, Spears sounds about as intimate as a blowup doll." Sal Cinquemani of Slant Magazine stated: "Britney's fourth album, In The Zone, finds the pop tart coming of age with a bold mix of hip-hop and dance music, wiping clean the last traces of her bubblegum-pop past. [...] For the most part, In The Zone is a big, fat, thumping love letter to the dancefloor, which makes Madonna's involvement [...] even more appropriate." Dorian Lynskey of The Guardian commented: "Unlike previous Britney albums, In the Zone has no filler and no shoddy cover versions, just 57 varieties of blue-chip hit-factory pop. There is southern hip-hop, deep house, Neptunes-style R&B, the ubiquitous Diwali beat and, most importantly, oodles of Madonna." Jason King of Vibe deemed it as "A supremely confident dance record that also illustrates Spears's development as a songwriter."

Accolades 

|-
! scope="row" rowspan="2"| 2004
| Japan Gold Disc Award
| International Rock Albums of the Year
| rowspan="2"| In the Zone
| 
| align="center"| 
|-
| Premios Oye!
| English Album of the Year
| 
| align="center"| 
|-
! scope="row"| 2004
| Billboard Music Award
| Female Billboard 200 Album Artist of the Year
| Britney Spears
| 
| align="center"| 
|-
! scope="row"| 2005
| Grammy Award
| Best Dance Recording
| "Toxic"
| 
| align="center"| 
|}

Commercial performance 

In the United States, In the Zone debuted atop the Billboard 200 chart dated December 6, 2003, with first-week sales of 609,000 copies. It initially registered the highest first-week sales of 2003 for a female artist, before Alicia Keys surpassed Spears with The Diary of Alicia Keys two weeks later. Spears also became the second female artist in Billboard'''s history to have four consecutive number-one albums, behind Janet Jackson who had the most at the time with five. The album was certified double platinum by the Recording Industry Association of America (RIAA) on December 16, for shipments of two million copies. It placed at number eight on the year-end Billboard 200 for 2004. As of 2015, it has sold over three million copies in the country, according to Nielsen SoundScan. In Canada, the album debuted at number two on the Canadian Albums Chart, with first-week sales of 31,000 units. It was certified triple platinum by the Canadian Recording Industry Association (CRIA) for shipments of 300,000 copies.

In the United Kingdom, In the Zone debuted at number 14 on the UK Albums Chart, peaking at number 13 in its 34th week and spending a total of 43 weeks on the chart. It was certified platinum by the British Phonographic Industry (BPI) in March 2004. The album attained higher peaks across mainland Europe, reaching the top ten in Austria, Belgium, the Czech Republic, Denmark, Germany, Greece, Hungary, Ireland, the Netherlands, Sweden and Switzerland, and peaking at number three on the European Top 100 Albums. In France, it debuted at number one, becoming her second number-one album in the country after Oops!... I Did It Again (2000), and was certified double gold by the Syndicat National de l'Édition Phonographique (SNEP) in December 2004. It was certified platinum by the IFPI in April, for selling one million copies across Europe.

Across Latin America, In the Zone debuted atop the charts and was certified platinum in Argentina and Mexico. In Australia, the album debuted and peaked at number ten on the ARIA Top 100 Albums. It was certified platinum by the Australian Recording Industry Association (ARIA) in 2004. In New Zealand, it debuted at number 28; in April 2004, it peaked at number 25 and was certified gold by the Recording Industry Association of New Zealand (RIANZ). The album was a commercial success across Asia, debuting at number one in South Korea. In Japan, the album debuted at number three on the Oricon Albums Chart, selling 59,128 copies in its first week. It was certified platinum by the Recording Industry Association of Japan (RIAJ) in December 2003. According to the International Federation of the Phonographic Industry (IFPI), In the Zone was the eighth best-selling album of 2003.

 Impact and legacy In the Zone has been declared a metamorphosis for Spears by numerous critics. Stephen Thomas Erlewine of AllMusic commented: "If 2001's Britney was a transitional album, capturing Spears at the point when she wasn't a girl and not yet a woman, its 2003 follow-up, In the Zone, is where she has finally completed that journey and turned into Britney, the Adult Woman." Erlewine compared Spears to her peer Christina Aguilera, explaining that both equated maturity with transparent sexuality and the pounding sounds of nightclubs, but while Aguilera "comes across like a natural-born skank, Britney is the girl next door cutting loose at college, drinking and smoking and dancing and sexing just a little too recklessly, since this is the first time she can indulge herself." Sal Cinquemani of Slant Magazine stated: "For a girl who's always seemed too sexed-up for her age, In the Zone finds Britney finally filling her britches, so-to-speak. Her little girl coquettishness actually works now—maybe because, at 21, she's finally a woman." Jason King of Vibe said the album showcased a transformed Spears, "no longer a girl, and all the woman any man can handle."

Following the abrupt conclusion of the Onyx Hotel Tour due to her knee injury, Spears embarked on a prolonged hiatus from performing, and would not release another studio album until Blackout in October 2007. She began a relationship with Kevin Federline, whom she met while on tour in April 2004 and married on September 18.  Her first greatest hits album Greatest Hits: My Prerogative was released in November, debuting at number four on the US Billboard 200. Spears was unable to promote it, though the album produced two international hit singles–"My Prerogative" and "Do Somethin'". In September 2005, Spears gave birth to her first son Sean Preston, giving birth to her second son Jayden James a year later. In November 2006, filed for divorce from Federline, citing irreconcilable differences; the divorce was finalized in July 2007. Within that period, Spears was involved in a series of media scandals and suffered from a mental breakdown, most notably shaving her head in February 2007.

Several critics have credited In the Zone for influencing pop music of the 2000s. In 2009, Amy Schriefer of NPR listed the album among the "50 Most Important Recordings of the Decade". Calling it "a primer on the sound of pop in the '00s", she deemed Spears as the ideal vehicle for a futuristic sound, since she was still trying to break away from her teen pop past. Schriefer praised "Toxic" and "Everytime", and added: "While the decade's history of celebrity obsession, paparazzi voyeurism and conflicted constructions of female sexuality and motherhood are written on Spears' body, the decade's history of impeccably crafted pop is written on her body of work." Celebrating the album's 15th anniversary in 2018, Jason Lipshutz of Billboard claimed it "signaled a more mature direction for Spears as she explored electronic music and hip-hop like never before. And the record's lyrics — which referenced her breakup with Justin Timberlake and pushed back at her critics in the media — celebrated new levels of independence and candor for the singer."

Los Angeles pop-up museum The Zone, celebrating Spears' "iconic songs, videos, and outfits through Instagram-worthy photo ops, interactive displays and personalized content activated by special RFID wristbands", was titled after the album and opened in January 2020.

 Track listing 

Notes
  signifies a co-producer.
  signifies a vocal producer.
  signifies a remix producer.

Sample credits
 "Toxic" contains a sample of "Tere Mere Beech Mein" by Lata Mangeshkar and S. P. Balasubrahmanyam from the film Ek Duuje Ke Liye (1981).

 Personnel 
Credits are adapted from the liner notes of In the Zone.

 Ed Alton – string arrangement (track 8)
 Steve Anderson – keyboards (track 4), programming (track 4), songwriting (track 4)
 J.D. Andrew – engineering assistance (tracks 3 and 6)
 Annet Artani – songwriting (track 12)
 Steve Bearsley – engineering assistance (track 7)
 Tom Bender – engineering assistance (track 10)
 BlackCell – backing vocals (tracks 3 and 6)
 Bloodshy & Avant – arrangement (tracks 3 and 6), digital editing (tracks 3 and 6), engineering (tracks 3 and 6), instrumentation (tracks 3 and 6), production (tracks 3 and 6), programming (tracks 3 and 6), songwriting (tracks 3 and 6)
 Ray Brown – styling
 B.U.D. – backing vocals (track 9)
 Sean "P. Diddy" Combs – production (track 14), songwriting (track 14)
 Fran Cooper – make-up
 Courtney Copeland – backing vocals (tracks 1 and 13)
 Josh Copp – engineering assistance (track 2)
 Tom Coyne – mastering (all tracks)
 Cathy Dennis – backing vocals (tracks 3 and 6), songwriting (tracks 3 and 6)
 DaCorna Boyz – keyboards (track 9)
 Patrick Demarchelier – photography
 Kara DioGuardi – backing vocals (track 11), songwriting (track 11)
 Dan Dymtrow – management representation
 Roxanne Estrada – backing vocals (tracks 1, 7, 9 and 13)
 Niklas Flyckt – mixing (tracks 3 and 6)
 Chriss Fudurich – engineering (track 8)
 Matt Furmidge – engineering assistance (track 4)
 Andy Gallas – engineering (track 7)
 Abel Garibaldi – engineering (track 7), programming (track 7)
 Roy Gartrell – banjo (track 2), guitar (track 2)
 Şerban Ghenea – mixing (tracks 1, 2, 5, 7 and 9)
 Brad Gilderman – engineering (track 8)
 Lori Goldstein – styling
 Lisa Greene – backing vocals (track 4), songwriting (track 4)
 Mick Guzauski – mixing (track 10)
 Rob Haggert – engineering assistance (tracks 1, 8 and 13)
 Chris Haggerty – digital editing (track 3)
 Roy "Royalty" Hamilton – arrangement (track 2), backing vocals (track 2), instrumentation (track 2), production (track 2), songwriting (track 2)
 Dug Hanes – Pro-Tools engineering (track 5)
 John Hanes – digital editing (tracks 1, 7, 9 and 13), Pro-Tools engineering (tracks 2 and 5)
 Jimmy Harry – arrangement (track 8), guitar (track 8), keyboards (track 8), production (track 8), programming (track 8), songwriting (track 8)
 Emma Holmgren – backing vocals (tracks 3 and 6)
 Vance Hornbuckle – engineering assistance (track 5)
 Isabel – make-up
 Janson & Janson – string arrangement (track 6), string conduction (track 6)
 Henrik Jonback – guitar (tracks 3 and 6), songwriting (tracks 3 and 6)
 Juggy D – backing vocals (track 13)
 Jennifer Karr – backing vocals (track 11)
 R. Kelly – backing vocals (track 7), mixing (track 7), production (track 7), songwriting (track 7)
 Brian Kierulf – engineering (tracks 11 and 15), guitar (track 11), keyboards (tracks 11 and 15), production (tracks 11 and 15), programming (tracks 11 and 15), songwriting (tracks 11 and 15), vocal editing (tracks 11 and 15), vocal engineering (tracks 11 and 15)
 Laurentius – hair
 Stephen Lee – songwriting (track 4)
 Kyron Leslie – backing vocals (track 5)
 Ryan Leslie – instrumentation (track 14), production (track 14), songwriting (track 14)
 Vanessa Letocq – production coordination (track 4)
 Vivien Lewit – legal representation 
 Thomas Lindberg – bass (tracks 3 and 6)
 Paul Logus – mixing (track 14)
 Stephanie Louise – hair, make-up
 Steve Lunt – A&R, arrangement (tracks 1–3, 6, 9 and 13)
 Donnie Lyle – guitar (track 7)
 Madonna – songwriting (tracks 1 and 13), vocals (tracks 1 and 13)
 Penelope Magnet – arrangement (tracks 1 and 9), backing vocals (tracks 1, 5, 7, 9 and 13), production (tracks 1, 9 and 13), songwriting (tracks 1, 5, 9 and 13), vocal arrangement (tracks 5 and 7), vocal production (tracks 5 and 7)
 Marla Weinhoff Studio – set design
 The Matrix – arrangement (track 10), backing vocals (track 10), engineering (track 10), production (track 10), songwriting (track 10)
 Charles McCrorey – engineering assistance (tracks 1 and 13)
 Sean McGhee – editing (track 12), engineering (track 12), mixing (track 12)
 Mentor – keyboards (track 13)
 Ian Mereness – engineering (track 7), programming (track 7)
 Charlie Midnight – songwriting (track 10)
 Jason Mlodzinski – engineering assistance (track 7)
 Moby – engineering (track 5), instrumentation (track 5), production (track 5), programming (track 5), songwriting (track 5)
 Lyn Montrose – engineering assistance (track 14)
 Balewa Muhammad – songwriting (track 8)
 Pablo Munguia – engineering (tracks 2 and 4)
 Jackie Murphy – art direction, packaging design
 Terius Nash – songwriting (tracks 1 and 13)
 Andrew Nast – engineering assistance (track 10)
 Kendall Nesbitt – keyboards (track 7)
 Thabiso "Tab" Nkhereanye – songwriting (tracks 1, 9 and 13)
 Gary O'Brien – guitar (tracks 1, 9 and 13), songwriting (tracks 1 and 13)
 Oribe – hair
 Jonas Östman – engineering assistance (tracks 3 and 6)
 Pardeep Sandhu Orchestra – algozee (track 13), tumbi (track 13)
 Rob Paustian – engineering (track 14)
 Ranjit – photography
 Jason Rankins – engineering assistance (track 2)
 Rishi Rich – programming (track 13), remix production (track 13)
 Emma Roads – backing vocals (tracks 1 and 13)
 Tim Roberts – engineering assistance (tracks 1, 2, 5, 7, 9 and 13)
 Chyna Royal – backing vocals (track 2), songwriting (track 2)
 Larry Rudolph – management
 Josh Schwartz – backing vocals (track 15), engineering (tracks 11 and 15), guitar (tracks 11 and 15), production (tracks 11 and 15), songwriting (tracks 11 and 15)
 Alexis Seaton – engineering assistance (track 14)
 Guy Sigsworth – instrumentation (track 12), production (track 12)
 Slam – production coordination (track 14)
 Shep Solomon – production (track 8), songwriting (track 8)
 Britney Spears – arrangement (tracks 1 and 9), songwriting (tracks 1, 3, 5, 8–13 and 15), vocals (all tracks)
 Mark "Spike" Stent – mixing (tracks 1 and 8), vocal engineering (tracks 1 and 13)
 Mary Alice Stephenson – styling
 Christopher Stewart – arrangement (tracks 1 and 9), backing vocals (track 5), instrumentation (tracks 1 and 9), production (tracks 1, 9 and 13), programming (tracks 1 and 9), songwriting (tracks 1, 5, 9 and 13), vocal arrangement (tracks 5 and 7), vocal production (tracks 5 and 7)
 Stockholm Session Strings – strings (track 6)
 Rich Tapper – engineering (track 2), engineering assistance (tracks 4, 5, 7 and 9)
 Mark Taylor – engineering (track 4), mixing (track 4), production (track 4)
 Brian "B-Luv" Thomas – digital editing (tracks 1, 5, 7, 9 and 13), engineering (tracks 1 and 9), vocal engineering (tracks 5, 7 and 13)
 David Treahearn – engineering assistance (tracks 1, 8 and 13)
 Mike Tucker – vocal editing (tracks 11 and 15), vocal engineering (tracks 11 and 15)
 Seth Waldmann – engineering assistance (track 12)
 P-Dub Walton – digital editing (tracks 1, 8 and 13)
 Nathan Wheeler – engineering assistance (track 7)
 The Wizardz of Oz – backing vocals (track 10)
 Dan Yashiv – digital editing (track 8)
 Ying Yang Twins – songwriting (track 2), vocals (track 2)
 Jong Uk Yoon – engineering assistance (track 4)
 Tony Zeller – engineering assistance (tracks 11 and 15)

 Charts 

 Weekly charts 

 Year-end charts 

 Decade-end charts 

 Certifications and sales 

 Release history 

 See also 
 Britney Spears: In the Zone Britney Spears discography
 List of Billboard 200 number-one albums of 2003
 List of number-one hits of 2003 (France)

 Notes 

 References 

 Bibliography 

 
 

Further reading

 
 
 

 External links 
 Official website
 
 In the Zone'' at Metacritic

2003 albums
Albums produced by Bloodshy & Avant
Albums produced by Guy Sigsworth
Albums produced by the Matrix (production team)
Albums produced by Sean Combs
Albums produced by R. Kelly
Albums produced by Tricky Stewart
Britney Spears albums
Jive Records albums
Albums produced by Moby
Hip hop albums by American artists
Albums produced by Mark Taylor (music producer)
Albums recorded at Olympic Sound Studios
Albums recorded at Westlake Recording Studios
Electropop albums